Sir John Grey, of Groby, Leicestershire (c. 1432 – 17 February 1461) was a Lancastrian knight, the first husband of Elizabeth Woodville who later married King Edward IV of England, and great-great-grandfather of Lady Jane Grey.

Titles
Grey was the son and heir of Elizabeth Ferrers, 6th Baroness Ferrers of Groby (1419–1483) and of Sir Edward Grey (c. 1415–1457), a son of Reginald Grey, 3rd Baron Grey de Ruthyn. His father was summoned to parliament as Baron Ferrers of Groby in right of his wife. After the death of Grey's father in 1457, his mother married his stepfather, John Bourchier, in 1462; he assumed his wife's title, Baron Ferrers of Groby.

As Grey predeceased his mother, Lady Ferrers, the title of Baron Ferrers of Groby passed to his eldest son and heir, Thomas. Grey was never summoned to Parliament. Another title, Baron Grey of Groby, was created 21 July 1603 for his direct descendant, Henry Grey (c.1547–1614). On the death of his father, John inherited the title of Baron Astley from his father, who inherited it from his grandfather, which his son would inherit on his death.

Wife and children
About 1454, Sir John Grey married Elizabeth Woodville, the eldest daughter of Richard Woodville and Jacquetta of Luxembourg. They had two sons, Thomas, later Marquess of Dorset, born in 1455, and Richard, born in 1457. Richard was aged about 26 when executed on the orders of Richard III in June 1483.  

In 1491, John's widow, by then queen dowager, became the co-heiress of her brother, Richard Woodville, 3rd Earl Rivers. She died a year later.

Death at the battle of St Albans
Sir John Grey was killed in the Second Battle of St Albans in 1461, fighting for the Lancastrian cause. His widow, Lady Elizabeth Grey, later secretly married Edward IV who was the successful Yorkist claimant to the throne.

See also
Groby
Groby Old Hall
Groby Castle
Bradgate House

References

Medieval English knights
Year of birth uncertain
1432 births
1461 deaths
John Grey of Groby
People from Groby
15th-century English nobility
Knights Bachelor
Barons Astley (1295)